The Niue national rugby sevens team is a minor national sevens side.

IRB Sevens World Series

2005–06 World Sevens Series

2008–09 IRB Sevens World Series

2009 Wellington Sevens

Pool B

2011–12 IRB Sevens World Series

2011 Gold Coast Sevens
Pool A

Bowl Quarter-Final

Shield Semi-Final

Commonwealth Games

Melbourne 2006: Group B

Current squad
2011–12 IRB Sevens World Series - Australia Leg
Leonale Bourke
Matt Faleuka
Uani Talagi
Rudolf Ainuu
Hayden Head
Tony Pulu
Vincent Pihigia
Sanualio Sakalia
Zac Makavilitogia
Kenny Akulu
Huggard Tongatule
Ricki Helagi

See also
 Niue national rugby union team (XV)

References

National rugby sevens teams
Rugby union in Niue
S
Niue at the Commonwealth Games